An afterimage is an image that continues to appear in the eyes after a period of exposure to the original image. An afterimage may be a normal phenomenon (physiological afterimage) or may be pathological (palinopsia). Illusory palinopsia may be a pathological exaggeration of physiological afterimages. Afterimages occur because photochemical activity in the retina continues even when the eyes are no longer experiencing the original stimulus.

The remainder of this article refers to physiological afterimages. A common physiological afterimage is the dim area that seems to float before one's eyes after briefly looking into a light source, such as a camera flash. Palinopsia is a common symptom of visual snow.

Negative afterimages
Negative afterimages are primarily caused by neural adaptation of the cells that carry signals from the retina of the eye to the rest of the brain, the retinal ganglion cells. There is also a small contribution when the eye's photoreceptors, the rods and cones, adapt to overstimulation and lose sensitivity. There is brain contribution as well.

Normally, any image is moved over the retina by small eye movements known as microsaccades before much adaptation can occur. However, if the image is very intense and brief, or if the image is large, or if the eye remains very steady, these small movements cannot keep the image on unadapted parts of the retina.

Afterimages can be seen when moving from a bright environment to a dim one, like walking indoors on a bright snowy day. They are accompanied by neural adaptation in the occipital lobe of the brain that function similar to color balance adjustments in photography. These adaptations attempt to keep vision consistent in dynamic lighting. Viewing a uniform background while adaptation is still occurring will allow an individual to see the afterimage because localized areas of vision are still being processed by the brain using adaptations that are no longer needed.

The Young-Helmholtz trichromatic theory of color vision postulated that there were three types of photoreceptors in the eye, each sensitive to a particular range of visible light: short-wavelength cones, medium-wavelength cones, and long-wavelength cones. Trichromatic theory, however, cannot explain all afterimage phenomena. Specifically, afterimages are the complementary hue of the adapting stimulus, and trichromatic theory fails to account for this fact.

The failure of trichromatic theory to account for afterimages indicates the need for an opponent-process theory such as that articulated by Ewald Hering (1878) and further developed by Hurvich and Jameson (1957). The opponent process theory states that the human visual system interprets color information by processing signals from cones and rods in an antagonistic manner. The opponent color theory is that there are three opponent channels: red versus green, blue versus yellow, and black versus white. Responses to one color of an opponent channel are antagonistic to those of the other color. Therefore, a green image will produce a magenta afterimage. The green color adapts the green channel, so they produce a weaker signal. Anything resulting in less green is interpreted as its paired primary color, which is magenta (an equal mixture of red and blue).

Example video which produces a distorted illusion after one watches it and looks away. See motion aftereffect.

Positive afterimages
Positive afterimages, by contrast, appear the same color as the original image. They are often very brief, lasting less than half a second. The cause of positive afterimages is not well known, but possibly reflects persisting activity in the brain when the retinal photoreceptor cells continue to send neural impulses to the occipital lobe.

A stimulus which elicits a positive image will usually trigger a negative afterimage quickly via the adaptation process. To experience this phenomenon, one can look at a bright source of light and then look away to a dark area, such as by closing the eyes. At first one should see a fading positive afterimage, likely followed by a negative afterimage that may last for much longer. It is also possible to see afterimages of random objects that are not bright, only these last for a split second and go unnoticed by most people.

On empty shape

An afterimage in general is an optical illusion that refers to an image continuing to appear after exposure to the original image has ceased. Prolonged viewing of the colored patch induces an afterimage of the complementary color (for example, yellow color induces a bluish afterimage). The "afterimage on empty shape" effect is related to a class of effects referred to as contrast effects.

In this effect, an empty (white) shape is presented on a colored background for several seconds. When the background color disappears (becomes white), an illusionary color similar to the original background is perceived within the shape. The mechanism of the effect is still unclear, and may be produced by one or two of the following mechanisms:

During the presentation of the empty shape on a colored background, the colored background induces an illusory complementary color ("induced color") inside the empty shape. After the disappearance of the colored background an afterimage of the "induced color" might appear inside the "empty shape". Thus, the expected color of the shape will be complementary to the "induced color", and therefore similar to the color of the original background.
After the disappearance of the colored background, an afterimage of the background is induced. This induced color has a complementary color to that of the original background. It is possible that this background afterimage induces simultaneous contrast on the "empty shape". Simultaneous contrast is a psychophysical phenomenon of the change in the appearance of a color (or an achromatic stimulus) caused by the presence of a surrounding average color (or luminance).

Gallery

See also
Book of Optics
Emmert's law
Lilac chaser
McCollough effect
Motion aftereffect
Neural adaptation
Palinopsia
Persistence of vision
Screen burn-in
Spectropia
Visual perception
After images photography by Ziad Antar

Notes

External links

The Palinopsia Foundation is dedicated to increasing awareness of palinopsia, to funding research into the causes, prevention and treatments for palinopsia, and to advocating for the needs of individuals with palinopsia and their families.
Eye On Vision Foundation raises money and awareness for persistent visual conditions
Afterimages, a small demonstration.
afterimage examples 
The Color Dove Illusion

Optical illusions
Vision
Articles containing video clips